Should Men Walk Home? is a 1927 American short silent comedy film directed by Leo McCarey and starring Mabel Normand and featuring Oliver Hardy and Eugene Pallette.

Cast
 Mabel Normand as The Girl Bandit
 Creighton Hale as The Gentleman Crook
 Eugene Pallette as Detective, Intelligence Bureau
 Oliver Hardy as Party Guest at Punch Bowl
 Edgar Dearing as Motorcycle Cop (uncredited)
 Fay Holderness as The Nurse (uncredited)
 Blanche Payson as Party Guest (uncredited)
 L.J. O’Connor as Bit Role (uncredited)
 Clara Guiol as Bit Role (uncredited)
 Gloria Lee as Normand's Double (uncredited)

See also
 List of American films of 1927
 Oliver Hardy filmography

References

External links

1927 films
American silent short films
American black-and-white films
1927 comedy films
1927 short films
Silent American comedy films
Films directed by Leo McCarey
American comedy short films
1920s American films